Ashraf Mahmood Wathra was the 18th Governor of State Bank of Pakistan. He was appointed as the State Bank Governor on 29 April 2014 and served until 28 April 2017.

Wathra represents Pakistan in several international forums. He serves on the board of governors of the International Monetary Fund, Asian Clearing Union and ECO Trade and Development Bank. He is also the council member of Islamic Financial Stability Board. Since July 1, 2015, Wathra has been the co-chair of the Financial Stability Board - Regional Consultative Group for Asia (FSB-RCG Asia). He will serve as co-chair for a period of two years.

Wathra holds important positions within Pakistan including the member of Monetary and Fiscal Policies Coordination Board, National Financial Inclusion Strategy (NFIS) Council, National Executive Committee on Anti Monetary Laundering (AML), and chair of the Board of Institute of Bankers in Pakistan (IBP), NFIS Steering Committee, and Agricultural Credit Advisory Committee (ACAC).

Wathra's association with the SBP started when he assumed charge of the office of Deputy Governor, on March 11, 2013. The Federal Government notified his appointment as Deputy Governor, SBP on March 5, 2013, for a period of three years from the date he assumed office.

He has 35 years of commercial, corporate and investment banking experience. Prior to joining SBP, he had been associated with various international and national banks and worked in various regulatory regimes in leadership positions; including Singapore, Hong Kong, Australia, Bangladesh, Sri Lanka etc. He also served as a member of Board of Directors of Habib Finance International Hong Kong, Habib Finance Australia and as First Vice Chairman of Himalayan Bank Nepal for several years.

He had started his career with Grindlays Bank Plc in 1978 and holds a master's degree in Business Administration and has attended numerous management courses at prestigious institutions around the globe.

See also 

 State Bank of Pakistan
 Governor of State Bank of Pakistan
 National Bank of Pakistan
 Pakistani Rupee
 Banking in Pakistan

References

Governors of the State Bank of Pakistan
Living people
Year of birth missing (living people)